Yakovlev (Яковлев) is an East Slavic surname derived from the masculine given name Yakov. Yakovleva is the feminine form.

Notable people with the surname include:

 Alexander Yakovlev (disambiguation), several people
 Anatoli Yakovlev (1913–1993), Soviet spymaster in New York City
 Andrei Yakovlev (born 1995), Russian footballer 
 Boris Yakovlev (1945–2014), Soviet Ukrainian race walker
 Dmitry Yakovlev, Kazakhstani beach volleyball player
 Egor Yakovlev (born 1991), Russian ice hockey player 
 Elena Yakovleva (born 1961), Russian actress
 Gennady Yakovlev (born 1938), Russian botanist
 Ivan Yakovlev (1848–1930), Chuvash enlightener, educator, and writer
 Lora Yakovleva (born 1932), Russian chess grandmaster
 Maksim Sergeyevich Yakovlev (born 1991), Russian footballer 
 Mikhail Yakovlev (footballer, born 1892) (1892–1942), Russian footballer 
 Natalya Yakovleva (handballer) (born 1986), Kazakhstani handball player
 Nataliya Yakovleva (swimmer) (born 1971), Russian Olympic Swimmer
 Nikolai Dmitriyevich Yakovlev (1898–1972), Soviet military leader
 Oleg Yakovlev (footballer, born 1970), Russian football player and manager 
 Oleg Yakovlev (footballer, born 1997), Russian footballer 
 Olga Vitalevna Yakovleva (1970–2015), Russian singer known as Origa
 Pavel Yakovlev (disambiguation), several people
 Postnik Yakovlev, Russian architect of St Basil's Cathedral in Moscow, active 1555–1588
 Roman Yakovlev (born 1976), Russian volleyball player
 Sergei Yakovlev (disambiguation), several people
 Vadim Yakovlev, Russian Cossack cavalry commander, active 1914–1923
 Valentina Yakovleva (born 1947), Soviet Olympic Swimmer
 Varvara Yakovleva (died 1918), Russian Orthodox nun and saint
 Varvara Yakovleva (politician) (1884–1941), Russian Bolshevik leader
 Vasily Yakovlev (1885–1938), Finnish Bolshevik revolutionary and politician
 Vasily Evgrafovich Yakovlev (1839–1908), Russian entomologist
 Vasyl Yakovlev (born 1972), Ukrainian Olympic cyclist
 Vitali Yakovlev (born 1985), Russian footballer 
 Vladimir Anatolyevich Yakovlev (born 1944), Russian politician
 Vladimir Yakovlev (general) (born 1954), Russian military commander
 Vladimir Yakovlev (journalist) (born 1959), Russian journalist and editor
 Vladislav Yakovlev (rower) (born 1993), Kazakhstani rower
 Yakov Yakovlev (1896–1938), Soviet statesman and politician
 Yegor Yakovlev (1930–2005), Russian journalist
 Yuriy Yakovlev (disambiguation), several people

See also 
 Dima Yakovlev Law, Russian law defining sanctions against certain US citizens
 Yakovlev (disambiguation)
 

Surnames from given names
Russian-language surnames